The men's 50 metre backstroke competition of the swimming event at the 2017 Southeast Asian Games was held on 21 August at the National Aquatic Centre in Kuala Lumpur, Malaysia.

Records

The following records were established during the competition:

Schedule
All times are Malaysia Standard Time (UTC+08:00)

Results

Heats
The heats were held on 21 August.

Heat 1

Heat 2

Final

The final was held on 21 August.

References

Men's 50 metre backstroke